Volleyball at the 1978 All-Africa Games was held in Algiers, Algeria and in the first time women competition was included.

Events

Medal table

Medal summary

Medal table

References

External links
Men's Competitions
Women's Competitions

Volleyball at the African Games
A
1978 All-Africa Games
International volleyball competitions hosted by Algeria